La Cueva is the Spanish word for "cave" and is also used in the surname "de la Cueva". It can also refer to:

Geography
La Cueva, Dominican Republic, a Dominican village in the Sánchez Ramírez Province
La Cueva, Mora County, New Mexico, an unincorporated community on the Mora River in Mora County, New Mexico, United States
La Cueva, Sandoval County, New Mexico
La Cueva, Santa Fe County, New Mexico
La Cueva de Roa, a municipality located in the province of Burgos, Castile and León, Spain
San Pedro de la Cueva (municipality), a municipality in Sonora in north-western Mexico

Buildings
La Cueva High School, a public high school located in northeast Albuquerque, New Mexico

Entertainment
La Cueva (film), a 2014 found footage film
La Cueva de Ali-Babá, a 1954 Argentine film

Surname
Beltrán de la Cueva, 1st Duke of Alburquerque
Francisco Fernández de la Cueva, 2nd Duke of Alburquerque
Beltrán de la Cueva, 3rd Duke of Alburquerque
Francisco Fernández de la Cueva, 4th Duke of Alburquerque
Gabriel de la Cueva, 5th Duke of Alburquerque
Francisco Fernández de la Cueva, 8th Duke of Alburquerque
Francisco Fernández de la Cueva, 10th Duke of Alburquerque
José María de la Cueva, 14th Duke of Alburquerque
Alfonso de la Cueva, 1st Marquis of Bedmar
Diego Fernández de la Cueva, 1st Viscount of Huelma
Baltasar de la Cueva, Count of Castellar
Gaspar de Ávalos de la Cueva, a Spanish Roman Catholic Roman Catholic bishop and cardinal
Beatriz de la Cueva, the Governor of the Spanish colony of Guatemala
Juan de la Cueva, a Spanish dramatist and poet
Jay de la Cueva, a Mexican producer, singer, bass player, drummer, guitarist, pianist and songwriter
Amado de la Cueva, a Mexican painter
Francisco de la Cueva, a Spanish philologist, playwright, jurist and writer
Mario de la Cueva, a Mexican jurist and rector of the Universidad Nacional Autónoma de México